Nazad Asaad (born 4 February 1988 in Iraq) is a Swedish retired footballer of Kurdish origin. He is currently working as a medical doctor in Sweden.

References

Swedish footballers
Association football wingers
1988 births
Living people
Association football midfielders
ŁKS Łódź players